The International Tennis Championships of Colombia is a defunct Grand Prix affiliated men's tennis tournament played from 1977 to 1980. It was held in Bogotá, Colombia and played on outdoor clay courts.

Finals

Singles

Doubles

External links
 ATP Results Archive

Clay court tennis tournaments
Tennis tournaments in Colombia
Grand Prix tennis circuit
Defunct tennis tournaments in Colombia
Defunct sports competitions in Colombia